Garra namyaensis is a species of cyprinid fish in the genus Garra which is found in the Namya River, Manilur India.

References 

Garra
Fish described in 2012